Carlotta Marchionni (1796–1864) was an Italian stage actress.

She was the leading lady and premier actress of the Royal Theatre of Sardinia between 1821 and 1840.

She was known for her interpretations of the tragedies by Vittorio Alfieri, Silvio Pellico and Carlo Marenco.

References 

1796 births
1864 deaths
19th-century Italian actresses